Paulo César Baier (born 25 October 1974), known as Paulo Baier, is a Brazilian football manager and former player who played as an right back.

Baier's 21-year career started in 1995 with São Luiz-RS, as a right back. Mainly associated to Criciúma, Goiás and Atlético Paranaense, he scored totals of 106 goals since the establishment of the round-robin format of the Série A, being the second-best in the tournament's history.

Playing career

Baier was born in Ijuí, Rio Grande do Sul, and started his career at the age of 12, training with Gaúcho's youth setup. In 1991, after representing hometown amateur sides Esporte Clube Flamengo Vila Santo Antônio and Sociedade Recreativa Esportiva Chorão, he went on a trial at São Luiz.

Baier subsequently joined the club's youth setup, but was converted into a right back during his formation. Promoted to the first team in 1995 and known as Paulo César, he was regularly used during his two-year spell.

In 1997, Baier joined Série A side Criciúma, after impressing in a friendly match against the club. He made his debut for the club on 5 July, starting in a 1–1 away draw against América-RN, and scored his first goal on 12 October, netting the last in a 2–0 home defeat of Bahia.

In the middle of 1998, after winning the year's Campeonato Catarinense, Baier moved to Atlético Mineiro (two stints). Sparingly used, he subsequently represented Botafogo, Vasco da Gama, América Mineiro and Pelotas before returning to Criciúma in 2002.

As the club already had a Paulo César in the squad, he was initially known as Paulo César Baier, but it was "too long". He then started to be called as Paulo Baier, and was a regular starter as the club won the year's Série B. In the final, he scored a hat-trick in a 4–1 home routing of Fortaleza.

Ahead of the 2004 season, Baier moved to Goiás also in the main category. He scored a career-best 15 league goals during the campaign, and added a further eight in 2005; in the latter year he also finished the Campeonato Goiano as the top goalscorer, with 12 goals.

On 7 December 2005, Baier signed a two-year deal with Palmeiras. On 16 March 2007, after having unpaid wages, he returned to his previous club Goiás.

On 5 January 2009, Baier moved to Sport, but rescinded his contract in June after several altercations with manager Nelsinho Baptista. He then moved to Atlético Paranaense,

On 30 December 2013, aged 39, Baier returned to his main club Criciúma after his contract with Atlético expired. A regular starter, he scored nine goals in all competitions, as his side suffered relegation.

Baier represented clubs in his native state in his two last campaigns, playing for Ypiranga, Juventude and first club São Luiz. He announced his retirement on 7 June 2016, at the age of 41, and finished his 21-year career as the second-best goalscorer of the Série A in the round-robin format, with 106 goals.

Managerial career
On 12 February 2017, Baier was announced as the new manager of Panambi, but turned down the offer the following day. On 14 August, he was named manager of Toledo Colônia Work, but only took over the club in December.

On 1 August 2018, Baier was named manager of Criciúma's neighbouring side Próspera, and won the third division of the Campeonato Catarinense in his first season in charge. He left in 2019 to take over Brusque, and returned to Toledo in 2020.

Back at Próspera in 2020, Baier led the club to the title of the second division of the Catarinense. On 4 May 2021, he returned to Criciúma after six years, but now as manager.

On 4 October 2021, despite leading Criciúma to the final stages of the 2021 Série C, Baier was sacked. On 14 February 2022, he replaced Pingo at the helm of his first professional side São José, but was himself sacked on 15 March.

On 23 May 2022, Baier replaced Leandro Zago at the helm of Botafogo-SP also in the third division. He led the club to a promotion in the 2022 Série C, but was sacked on 21 February 2023, despite leading their group in the 2023 Campeonato Paulista.

Personal life
Baier's younger brother Éder was also a footballer. He also represented São Luiz.

Career statistics

Honours

Player
Criciúma
Campeonato Catarinense: 1998
Campeonato Brasileiro Série B: 2002

Botafogo
Torneio Rio-São Paulo: 1999

América Mineiro
Copa Sul Minas: 2000

Sport
Campeonato Pernambucano: 2009

Manager
Próspera
Campeonato Catarinense Série C: 2018
Campeonato Catarinense Série B: 2020

Individual
 Bola de Prata: 2004
 Campeonato Goiano top goalscorer: 2005 (12 goals)
 Campeonato Brasileiro Série A Team of the Year: 2013

References

External links

1974 births
Living people
People from Ijuí
Brazilian people of German descent
Brazilian footballers
Brazilian football managers
Association football midfielders
Campeonato Brasileiro Série A players
Campeonato Brasileiro Série B players
Campeonato Brasileiro Série C players
Esporte Clube São Luiz players
Criciúma Esporte Clube players
Clube Atlético Mineiro players
Botafogo de Futebol e Regatas players
CR Vasco da Gama players
América Futebol Clube (MG) players
Esporte Clube Pelotas players
Goiás Esporte Clube players
Sociedade Esportiva Palmeiras players
Sport Club do Recife players
Club Athletico Paranaense players
Ypiranga Futebol Clube players
Esporte Clube Juventude players
Campeonato Brasileiro Série C managers
Brusque Futebol Clube managers
Criciúma Esporte Clube managers
Esporte Clube São José managers
Botafogo Futebol Clube (SP) managers
Sportspeople from Rio Grande do Sul